David Barrie Middleton (born 13 October 1965) is a former English cricketer.  Middleton was a right-handed batsman who played primarily as a wicketkeeper.  He was born at Bloxwich, Staffordshire.

Middleton represented the Worcestershire Cricket Board in 2 List A matches against Staffordshire in the 2001 Cheltenham & Gloucester Trophy and Buckinghamshire in the 1st round of the 2002 Cheltenham & Gloucester Trophy which was played in 2001.  In his 2 List A matches, he scored 7 runs at a batting average of 7.00, with a high score of 7.  Behind the stumps he took 2 catches.

References

External links
David Middleton at Cricinfo
David Middleton at CricketArchive

1965 births
Living people
People from Bloxwich
English cricketers
Worcestershire Cricket Board cricketers
Wicket-keepers